Elections to the Labour Party's Shadow Cabinet (more formally, its "Parliamentary Committee") occurred in 1953. In addition to the 12 members elected, the Leader (Clement Attlee), Deputy Leader (Herbert Morrison), Labour Chief Whip (William Whiteley), Labour Leader in the House of Lords (William Jowitt) were automatically members. All incumbent members of the Shadow Cabinet retained their seats.

The results of the election are listed below:

References

1953
1953 elections in the United Kingdom